Eliana Noemí Stábile (born 26 November 1993) is an Argentine professional footballer who plays as a left-back for Brazilian Série A1 club Santos FC and the Argentina women's national team. She is not related to Argentinian football legend Guillermo Stábile.

Club career
Born in Buenos Aires, Stábile played for River Plate and Boca Juniors in her home country before moving to Colombian side Atlético Huila for the 2018 Copa Libertadores Femenina. Ahead of the 2019 season, she returned to Boca.

On 4 February 2022, Stábile joined Brazilian side Santos.

International career
Stábile represented Argentina at the 2018 Copa América Femenina and helped the team to qualify for the 2019 FIFA Women's World Cup by scoring two goals against Panama during the CONCACAF–CONMEBOL play-off.

International goals
Scores and results list Argentina's goal tally first

Honors and awards

Clubs
River Plate
Torneo Clausura: 2009, 2010

Boca Juniors
Torneo Clausura: 2013
Torneo Inicial: 2013–14

Atlético Huila
Copa Libertadores Femenina: 2018

References

External links

1993 births
Living people
Sportspeople from Buenos Aires Province
Argentine women's footballers
Women's association football fullbacks
Women's association football midfielders
Club Atlético River Plate (women) players
Boca Juniors (women) footballers
Atlético Huila (women) players
Santos FC (women) players
Campeonato Brasileiro de Futebol Feminino Série A1 players
Argentina women's international footballers
2019 FIFA Women's World Cup players
Footballers at the 2019 Pan American Games
Medalists at the 2019 Pan American Games
Pan American Games medalists in football
Pan American Games silver medalists for Argentina
Argentine expatriate women's footballers
Argentine expatriate sportspeople in Colombia
Expatriate women's footballers in Colombia
Argentine expatriate sportspeople in Brazil
Expatriate women's footballers in Brazil